Sapulut is a town along Sapulut River in the Interior Division of Sabah, Malaysia. Mount Antulai (1713 metres) is located about 5 kilometres from the town. Nearby the town is the Batu Punggul limestone massif and cave, a popular spot for eco-tourists. The proposed new highway connecting Sapulut and Kalabakan in the Tawau Division is expected to be completed in mid-2007, and when completed will make road travel between Kota Kinabalu and Tawau easier and faster.

Towns in Sabah